Timur Yevgenyevich Rudoselsky (born 21 December 1994) is a Kazakh footballer who plays for Armenian Premier League club Alashkert.

Career
On 6 February 2019, Rudoselsky signed for Okzhetpes on a contract until the end of the 2019 season.

In March 2020, Rudoselsky signed for Belarusian Premier League club Smolevichi. However a week later Rudoselsky's contract was cancelled as he was unable to leave Kazakhstan to join up with his new club due to travel restrictions imposed in relation to the COVID-19 pandemic.

On 21 August 2020, Lori FC announced the signing of Rudoselsky from Kaisar. Following Lori's resignation from the Armenian Premier League on 5 April 2021, Rudoselsky returned to Kaisar on 14 April 2021.

On 28 July 2021, Rudoselsky returned to Armenia, signing for Sevan.

On 19 February 2022, Noravank announced the singing of Rudoselsky.

On 27 January 2023, Alashkert announced the singing of Rudoselsky.

Career statistics

Club

Notes

References

1994 births
Living people
Kazakhstani footballers
Kazakhstani Jews
Israeli footballers
Jewish footballers
FC Kairat players
FC Zhetysu players
Hapoel Petah Tikva F.C. players
FC Okzhetpes players
FC Kaisar players
FC Lori players
Kazakhstani emigrants to Israel
Association football defenders
Naturalized citizens of Israel
Expatriate footballers in Armenia
Kazakhstani expatriate sportspeople in Armenia
Israeli people of Kazakhstani-Jewish descent